The 1997 IAAF Grand Prix was the thirteenth edition of the annual global series of one-day track and field competitions organized by the International Association of Athletics Federations (IAAF). The series consisted of three levels: IAAF Grand Prix, IAAF Grand Prix II, and finally IAAF Permit Meetings. There were seventeen Grand Prix meetings and eleven Grand Prix II meetings, making a combined total of 28 meetings for the series from 20 February to 7 September. An additional 15 IAAF Outdoor Permit Meetings were attached to the circuit.

Performances on designated events on the circuit earned athletes points which qualified them for entry to the 1997 IAAF Grand Prix Final, held on 13 September in Fukuoka, Japan. Danish-Kenyan runner Wilson Kipketer was the winner of the overall men's title with 114 points, while Germany's Astrid Kumbernuss topped the women's rankings with 99 points in the discus throw.

Meetings

Key:

Points standings

Overall men

Overall women

References

Points standings
1997 Grand Prix Standings Overall - Men. IAAF. Retrieved 2019-10-01.
1997 Grand Prix Standings Overall - Women. IAAF. Retrieved 2019-10-01.

1997
IAAF Grand Prix